The Darling Fault is one of the longest and most significant faults in Australia, extending for at least 1500 km in a north–south orientation near the west coast of southern Western Australia. It is a major geological boundary separating the Archaean Yilgarn Craton in the east from the younger Pinjarra Orogen and overlying Phanerozoic Perth Basin to the west. The fault zone is very ancient and initially formed during the Proterozoic Eon.

In the Perth area, the Darling Fault must once have coincided with the Darling Scarp, the abrupt escarpment immediately east of the city of Perth, but the scarp has since eroded eastward of the fault, leaving a formation of foothills known as the Ridge Hill Shelf. The fault is located on the western edge of the Ridge Hill Shelf; a good reference point of its location is the point where the Great Eastern Highway passes over the current Eastern railway  line in Bellevue. When Greater Perth is looked from an aerial perspective, a faint line can be seen running down the edge of the hills.

Notes

References
 Myers, J. S. (1992) Pinjarra Orogen, in Geology and Mineral Resources of Western Australia: Western Australia Geological Survey, Memoir 3, 77–119.
 

Geology of Western Australia
Darling Range
Seismic faults of Australia